"Papa Was a Good Man" is a song written by songwriter Hal Bynum.

Released in September 1971 as a single (Columbia 4-45460, with "I Promise You" on the opposite side) by Johnny Cash, the song reached #16 on U.S. Billboard country chart and #104 on Billboard'''s Bubbling Under the Hot 100.

Both "I Promise You" (which is "a promise of devotion to June") and "Papa Was a Good Man" are part of Johnny Cash's 1972 album A Thing Called Love''.

Analysis

Track listing

Charts

References

External links 
 "Papa Was A Good Man" on the Johnny Cash official website

Songs about fathers
Songs about alcohol
Johnny Cash songs
1971 songs
1971 singles
Columbia Nashville Records singles
Songs written by Hal Bynum
American country music songs